Eurrhypis cacuminalis is a species of moth in the family Crambidae. It is found in Greece, Bulgaria, Moldova, Ukraine, Russia and Turkey.

Subspecies
Eurrhypis cacuminalis cacuminalis
Eurrhypis cacuminalis multiguttalis Staudinger, 1871 (Greece)

References

Moths described in 1843
Eurrhypini
Moths of Europe
Moths of Asia